"You're My Best Friend" is a song written by Wayland Holyfield, and recorded by American country music artist Don Williams.  It was released in April 1975 as the first single and title track from the album You're My Best Friend.  The song was Williams' second No. 1 hit on the Billboard Hot Country Singles chart in June 1975. It has since become one of Williams' signature songs, also reaching the UK Top 40.

Chart performance

References

"You're My Best Friend"  at Allmusic.

1975 singles
Don Williams songs
Songs written by Wayland Holyfield
ABC Records singles
Dot Records singles
1975 songs